Mexico competed at the 2008 Summer Olympics in Beijing. The country sent 85 competitors (43 men and 42 women) and participated in 23 sports. Mexico's flag-bearer at the opening ceremony was diver Paola Espinosa. Mexican athletes won two gold medals at the games for the first time since the 1984 Olympics.

Medalists

Archery

Mexico sent archers, two men and two women, to the Olympics for the eighth time, and had yet to win an Olympic medal in the sport. Two men received qualifying places in archery, after Luis Velez earned a qualifying spot during the 2007 World Outdoor Target Championships and Juan Serrano added another spot at the Pan American championships. The two women, Mariana Avitia and Aída Román, both earned their Olympic spots at the Pan American tournament.

Men

Women

Athletics

Men
Track & road events

Field events

Women
Track & road events

Field events

Badminton

Boxing

Mexico qualified three boxers for the Olympic boxing tournament. Santos Reyes was the first, qualifying in featherweight at the World Championships. Valdez was the second, qualifying at the first American qualifier. Vargas was the last, earning his spot at the second American tournament.

Canoeing

Sprint

Qualification Legend: QS = Qualify to semi-final; QF = Qualify directly to final

Cycling

Road

Diving

Men

Women

Equestrian

Dressage

Show jumping

Fencing

Women

Gymnastics

Artistic 
Women

Judo

Modern pentathlon

Rowing

Men

Women

Qualification Legend: FA=Final A (medal); FB=Final B (non-medal); FC=Final C (non-medal); FD=Final D (non-medal); FE=Final E (non-medal); FF=Final F (non-medal); SA/B=Semifinals A/B; SC/D=Semifinals C/D; SE/F=Semifinals E/F; QF=Quarterfinals; R=Repechage

Sailing

Men

Women

M = Medal race; EL = Eliminated – did not advance into the medal race; CAN = Race cancelled

Shooting

Men

Women

Swimming

Men

Women

Synchronized swimming

Table tennis

Taekwondo

Mexico wins its first gold medal in Taekwondo  with the victory of Guillermo Perez.

Triathlon

Volleyball

Beach

Weightlifting

Wrestling

Men's freestyle

See also
 Mexico at the 2007 Pan American Games
 Mexico at the 2008 Summer Paralympics
 Mexico at the 2010 Central American and Caribbean Games

References
Mexican delegation coverage (Spanish)

Nations at the 2008 Summer Olympics
2008
Summer Olympics